The Max Plan PF.204 Busard was a French-built light sporting monoplane of the early 1950s. Following some modifications it was redesignated as PF.214; a planned derivative, the PF.215, was never made. The plane led to the subsequent construction of the Lefebvre Busard, a single-seat racing aircraft built marketed for homebuilding.

Development
The PF.204 Busard was designed and built by Monsieur Max Plan for personal use as a racing and sporting monoplane. The PF.204 was of all-wood construction with plywood skin. The aircraft was fitted with a fixed cantilever undercarriage enclosed by light alloy fairings.

Operational history
Only one example of the Busard was completed in 1952. By 1956 it had received several modifications, the most noticeable being a revised engine cowling and enlarged cockpit; at this point it was redesignated the PF. 214.  At that time there were plans to replace the Minié with a 90 hp (67 kW) Continental C90 4-cylinder horizontally opposed engine, producing the PF.215.

After some years of active flying, it was placed in storage at Mitry-Mory airfield on the northeast outskirts of Paris by May 1957. It no longer appeared on the French civil aircraft register by 1964. By 2006 the aircraft was in storage at the Musée Regional de l'Air, Angers - Loire Airport, France.

Variants
Max Plan PF.204 Busard
The original racer, designed and built by Max Plan, powered by a  Minié 4.DC.32  h4-cyl. horizontally opposed piston engine.
Max Plan PF.214 Busard
The sole MP.204 re-designated after modifications to the engine cowling and an enlarged cockpit.
Max Plan PF.215 Busard
A planned derivative to have been powered by a  Continental C90 4-cyl. horizontally opposed piston engine.

Specifications (PF.204)

Notes

References

External links

Brief details of Max Plan PF.204 Busard technical specification

1950s French sport aircraft
Homebuilt aircraft
Single-engined tractor aircraft
Low-wing aircraft
Aircraft first flown in 1952
Conventional landing gear